Oscar McGuinness (born 19 December 1999) is an Australian representative lightweight rower. He has represented at senior World Championships.

Club and state rowing
McGuinness was raised in Adelaide and educated at St Peter's College, Adelaide where he took up rowing. He is the son of former Australian rules football player Tony McGuinness and Adelaide news presenter Georgina McGuinness.

Oscar's senior rowing has been from The Blackmore Club and the Adelaide Rowing Club.  He first made state selection for South Australia in the 2017 men's youth eight which contested the Noel Wilkinson Trophy at the Interstate Regatta within the Australian Rowing Championships.  He made a second South Australian youth eight appearance in 2018.

International representative rowing
In March 2022 McGuinness was selected in the Australian senior training team to prepare for the 2022 international season and the 2022 World Rowing Championships.  He competed as a lightweight men's single sculler at both World Rowing Cups in June and July 2022.  His World Championship debut was at the 2022 World Rowing Championships at Racize, where he rowed Australia's representative lightweight double scull with Redmond Matthews. They made the C final in which they finished fifth, for an overall seventeenth place at the regatta.

References

External links
McGuinness at World Rowing

1999 births
Living people
Australian male rowers